Brinsworth House is a residential and nursing retirement home for theatre and entertainment professionals in Staines Road, Twickenham, west London, England. The house is owned and run by the Royal Variety Charity and has 36 bedrooms, six living rooms, a library, an in-house bar and stage, and a staff of 64.

History 

Brinsworth House was built in 1850; it opened as a retirement home in 1911. 

The theatre architect Frank Matcham, in 1912, designed a wing at the house free of charge in aid of the fund. Work commenced in June and was completed in October.

The house is owned and maintained by the Royal Variety Charity, which was founded in 1908 to care for members of, what was at that time, the variety and music hall profession. The charity and the house are funded by the Royal Variety Performance, by voluntary donations and, since 2007, by part-proceeds from phone voting from ITV Network's Britain's Got Talent.

Residents
Previous celebrity residents have included:

Hylda Baker (died 1986)
Penny Calvert (died 2014), dancer and first wife of Sir Bruce Forsyth
Pearl Carr (died 2020)
Derek Cooper (died 2014), journalist, broadcaster and food specialist
Charlie Drake (died 2006)
Roy Fox (died 1982), British dance band leader
Alan Freeman (died 2006)
Mona Hammond (died 2022)
John Hewer (died 2008), best known for his role as Captain Birdseye
Dame Thora Hird (died 2003)
Teddy Johnson (died 2018)
Kathy Kirby (died 2011)
Mick McManus (died 2013)
Alf Pearson (died 2012)
Emily Perry (died 2008)
Ronnie Ronalde (died 2015), music hall singer and siffleur
Ben Warriss (died 1993)
Jack Wilson (died 1970), of Wilson, Keppel and Betty fame
Sir Norman Wisdom (died 2010)

Current residents include:
Richard O'Sullivan
Mike Yarwood

See also
 Denville Hall – retirement home for actors

References

External links
 
 Royal Variety Charity official site

1911 establishments in England
Britain's Got Talent
Houses in the London Borough of Richmond upon Thames
Residential buildings completed in 1850
Retirement communities
Retirement homes in the United Kingdom
Twickenham